"This Is Pop" is a song by the English rock band XTC from their 1978 album White Music.  A rerecorded version, typeset as "This Is Pop?", was released as the group's third single.

Background
Guitarist Andy Partridge wrote "This Is Pop" as a response to journalistic terms for music genres such as "punk", which he believed were redundant of "pop". The song's opening F chord was based on the Beatles' "A Hard Day's Night" (1964).

Legacy
The song title was adopted for the 2017 documentary about the band, XTC: This Is Pop.

Personnel
XTC
Barry Andrews – keyboards
Terry Chambers – drums
Colin Moulding – bass, vocals
Andy Partridge – vocals, guitar

References

External links
 "This Is Pop" on Chalkhills

XTC songs
1978 singles
1978 songs
Songs about pop music
Virgin Records singles
Songs written by Andy Partridge
Song recordings produced by John Leckie
Song recordings produced by Robert John "Mutt" Lange